Brendan King (born February 25, 1990) is an American soccer player.

Career

College & Youth
King played four years of college soccer at the University of Notre Dame between 2008 and 2011. While at college, King also appeared for USL PDL club Chicago Fire U-23.

Professional
On January 12, 2012, King was drafted in the second round (27th overall) of the 2012 MLS SuperDraft by Portland Timbers. However, he didn't sign with Portland, instead opting to sign with Irish club Bray Wanderers on July 5, 2012.

After spending time with Norwegian club Alta IF in 2012, King moved back to the United States when he signed with MLS side Chicago Fire on January 31, 2013. He was waived by Chicago on February 20, 2014, without making a first team appearance.

After almost year out of contract, King signed with USL club Austin Aztex on December 18, 2014.

References

External links
 Fighting Irish profile

1990 births
Living people
American soccer players
American expatriate soccer players
Notre Dame Fighting Irish men's soccer players
Chicago Fire U-23 players
Bray Wanderers F.C. players
Alta IF players
Chicago Fire FC players
Austin Aztex players
Association football midfielders
Soccer players from Illinois
Expatriate association footballers in Ireland
Expatriate footballers in Norway
Portland Timbers draft picks
USL League Two players
League of Ireland players
USL Championship players
United States men's youth international soccer players
Sportspeople from Naperville, Illinois